The 5th constituency of Fejér County is one of the single member constituencies of the National Assembly, the national legislature of Hungary. The constituency standard abbreviation: Fejér 05. OEVK.

Since 2014, it has been represented by Gábor Varga of the Fidesz–KDNP party alliance.

Geography
The 5th constituency is located in southern part of Fejér County.

List of municipalities
The constituency includes the following municipalities:

Members
The constituency was first represented by Gábor Varga of the Fidesz from 2014, and he was re-elected in 2018 and 2022.

References

Fejér 5th